Word 2 Y'all is the second studio album release by Canadian Christian pop and a cappella group Rhythm & News, in 1992.

Track listing

Personnel
Doug Zimmermann
Kevin Pollard 
Mark Batten
Brad Strelau

References 

Rhythm & News albums
1992 albums